The Tyung (Tüŋ) is a river in Yakutia, Russia. It is a left tributary of the Vilyuy (Lena's basin).

Course
The Tyung begins in the Central Siberian Plateau. When it descends into the Central Yakutian Lowland it begins to meander strongly and flows roughly southwards until it meets the Vilyuy. The Tyukyan, also a Vilyuy tributary, has its source in a swampy area near the Tyung basin.

The Tyung freezes up in October and stays icebound until the second half of May to early June. Its main tributaries are the rivers Chimidikyan and Dzhippa.

See also
List of rivers of Russia

References

Rivers of the Sakha Republic